Vitālijs Samoļins (born March 7, 1990, in Jelgava) is a Latvian chess player who holds the FIDE title of International Master (2009). He won the Latvian Chess Championship in 2009 and 2012.

Vitālijs Samoļins played for Latvia in Chess Olympiads:

 In 2006, at second reserve board in the 37th Chess Olympiad in Turin (+3 −3 =0);
 In 2008, at reserve board in the 38th Chess Olympiad in Dresden (+3 −0 =4).
 In 2012, at fourth board in the 40th Chess Olympiad in Istanbul (+2 −4 =1).

References

External links
 
 
 
 

1990 births
Living people
Latvian chess players
Chess Olympiad competitors
Chess International Masters
Sportspeople from Jelgava